The Defence (Citizen Military Forces) Act (1943) was federal Australian law passed on 26 January 1943 which extended the area in which the Militia were obliged to serve from Australia and its territories to the South-Western Pacific Zone (SWPZ),  a triangle bounded by the equator and the 110th and 159th meridians of longitude, for the duration of the war and up to six months of Australia ceasing to be involved in hostilities.

History of the Act
On 20 October 1939, a decade after the Scullin government abolished universal military training, and some six weeks after Australia had entered World War II, Prime Minister Robert Menzies issued a press statement announcing the reintroduction of compulsory military training with effect from 1 January 1940. The arrangements required unmarried men turning 21 in the call up period to undertake three months training with the Militia. Under the Defence Act (1903), they could not be compelled to serve outside Australia or its territories. For this purpose, a separate, volunteer force, the Second Australian Imperial Force (AIF) was raised for service overseas. 

Then Leader of the Opposition and leader of the Australian Labor Party (ALP), John Curtin, voiced his opposition in Parliament to the move by the Menzies’ Government and reiterated ALP opposition to compulsory military service overseas. 

However, as Prime Minister, Curtin sought to amend the ALP platform in order to allow members of the Militia to serve overseas. There were several reasons for this. For the purpose of military efficiency, the Commander in Chief, Sir Thomas Blamey had transferred large numbers of combat-experienced officers from the AIF to the Militia; the limits on where conscripts could serve hampered military planning; and there were large numbers of American conscripts arriving in Australia to assist in its defence. Despite rumours at the time, there is no evidence that Generals Blamey or MacArthur or the United States government ever recommended any change to the Australian government but there was vocal criticism of the government's policy in parliament led by Arthur Fadden. 

Curtin argued that:The US had saved Australia, and the Government had had a desperate fight to get aid for Australia. He did not want to live those months again. Now the position was that there was a barrage of criticism in Australia and United States was directed at Australia that it would have Americans defend Darwin, but not Australians fight for the Philippines.

On 5 January 1943 the Federal Conference of the ALP passed the following compromise resolution:That, having regard to the paramount necessity of Australia's defence, the Government be authorised to add to the definition of the territories to which the Defence Act extends the following words: ‘and such other territories in the South-west Pacific Area as the Governor-General proclaims as being territories associated with the defence of Australia’.

War Cabinet approved a bill to give effect to the motion on 26 January 1943. The bill provided for the use of Australian conscripts in the South-Western Pacific Zone (SWPZ) during the period of war. It also provided that this approval would lapse within six months of Australia ceasing to be involved in hostilities. Efforts by the opposition to amend the bill to allow the Governor General to alter the zone by proclamation, and by Labor MPs to add a clause requiring a referendum failed.

Effect of the Act
The overall military effect of the amendment was not great, as the Militia could already serve in Australian territories and it only extended the limits slightly. In the event, only a few militiamen served outside Australian territory, at Merauke in Dutch Western New Guinea and in the British Solomon Islands.

References

Acts of the Parliament of Australia
Military history of Australia during World War II
Conscription in Australia
1943 in Australian law
Conscription law